Gentilly may refer to:

France 
 Gentilly, Val-de-Marne, a commune of the Val-de-Marne département

Canada 
 Gentilly, Quebec, a suburb of the city of Bécancour
 Gentilly Nuclear Generating Station, a former nuclear power station in Bécancour, Quebec

United States 
 Gentilly, New Orleans, Louisiana, a neighborhood
 Gentilly Township, Minnesota